The Spain women's national beach soccer team represents Spain in international women's beach soccer competitions and is controlled by the RFEF, the governing body for football in Spain.

Competitive records

Euro Beach Soccer Cup

The Taça Europeia de Futebol de Praia Feminino (Women's Euro Beach Soccer Cup) is a European invitational tournament for national teams in women's beach soccer hosted by the Portuguese Football Federation. The first edition was held in Cascais (a coastal town near Lisbon) in 2016.

Results and fixtures
Spain women's national beach soccer team results

The following matches were played or are scheduled to be played by the national team in the current or upcoming seasons.

Players

Current squad
Head coach:  Joaquín Alonso
Caps and goals as of 15 July 2017.

Recent call-ups
The following players were named to a squad in the last twelve months.

See also

Spain national beach soccer team
Spain women's national football team
Spain women's national futsal team

References

European women's national beach soccer teams
B